Richard Clayton Johnson (9 May 1930 – 3 January 2003) was a researcher at the Georgia Tech Research Institute (GTRI) and the inventor of the Compact Antenna Range. He was also a professor of electrical engineering at the Georgia Institute of Technology., where he received his PhD in 1961.

References

1930 births
2003 deaths
Georgia Tech Research Institute people
Georgia Tech faculty
Georgia Tech alumni